This is the list of cities, towns, and villages in the country of Cameroon:

Villages 

 Bodo
 Goura, Centre Region
 Goura, Far North Region
 Ngoila
 Mmuock Leteh

See also
 Communes of Cameroon
 Departments of Cameroon
 Regions of Cameroon
 Subdivisions of Cameroon

References

External links

 Municipalities
Municipalities
Cameroon, List of municipalities in
Municipalities of Cameroon
Cameroon